J*S*T*A*R*S  is an electronic musical collaboration formed by Steve Cobby and Sim Lister in 2002, from Kingston upon Hull and Sheffield in Yorkshire.

Their debut release was a 12" vinyl, "Tripping the Light Fantastic" / "Ickey Plush" on the electronica label, Twentythree Records, which was also based in both Hull and Sheffield. Their first album, Put Me on a Planet (Steel Tiger Records) was named "one of the surprise hits of 2006" by Matt Anniss in the December 2006 issue of International DJ Magazine. 

Cobby and Lister were founders of both Steel Tiger Records and Twentythree Records. J*S*T*A*R*S's track "Loose Nuke Threat" from Put Me on a Planet featured in television/cinema advertisements for the John Lewis Partnership spring campaigns for 2004 and 2005.

"Loose Nuke Threat" also featured in the 2012 Fiat Panda TV advertising campaign. Eagle-i Music set up this synchronisation.

Discography

Albums
 Put Me on a Planet (Steel Tiger Records, 2007)

Singles
"Spansules" (Twentythree Records, 2003)
"Ooilovemababy" / "Positronic Absorber" (Twentythree Records, 2003)
"Tripping the Light Fantastic" / "Ickey Plush" (Twentythree Records, 2002)

See also
 List of independent UK record labels
 List of electronic music record labels
 Bands and musicians from Yorkshire and North East England

References
 "J*S*T*A*R*S one of the Fantastic Four - current hottest four names in dance music" by Terry Church & Tom Kihl, DJ Magazine, 10 October 2006, retrieved 6 April 2008

External links
Official website for J*S*T*A*R*S
International DJ Magazine / I-DJ
Rob da Bank - BBC Radio 1's Leftfield Show

English electronic music groups
Musical groups established in 2002
Musical groups from Kingston upon Hull
2002 establishments in England